Edward T. Miller (ca. 1856 – October 1881) was a Missouri born outlaw.

He was born in 1856, he was the son of Moses Miller and had an older brother called Clell Miller. Little is known about Miller, except that he took part in several robberies with Jesse James in Quantrill's Raiders, and especially after the downfall of Jesse's James-Younger gang. They robbed a train in Glendale, Missouri, in October 1879 and one in Blue Cut, Missouri, in September 1881. He was sentenced to 10 years in the Missouri State Penitentiary, but was released when he turned state's evidence on Bill Ryan.

The Kansas City Times [October 31, 1881] reported that Miller was killed by Jesse James in October, 1881. According to some sources he was killed for talking too much about the Kansas City Fair robbery, which took place in 1872. Others say Miller became drunk one night and told a marshal about a train robbery that was to take place in the near future. The Times story speculated that a woman was involved. According to family history, however, Miller and James faked Edward's death in order for him to leave the James-Younger gang. Edward moved to Kentucky where he lived the rest of his life.

Popular culture
Ed Miller was portrayed by Dennis Quaid in the movie The Long Riders.
Garret Dillahunt portrayed Ed Miller in the 2007 film The Assassination of Jesse James by the Coward Robert Ford.

References

1856 births
1881 deaths
Victims of the James–Younger Gang
Outlaws of the American Old West
American murder victims
People murdered in Missouri
Deaths by firearm in Missouri
Murdered criminals
 1881 murders in the United States